The Bridgend & District League is a football league covering the town of Bridgend and surrounding areas in South Wales. The leagues are at the eighth, ninth and tenth levels of the Welsh football league system.

Area
The radius of the league covers Ogmore Valley, the Llynfi Valley, Bridgend, the Garw Valley and Gilfach. The league's eastern side is Llanharry and its western side is Cefn Cribwr.

Divisions
The league is composed of three divisions.

Member clubs 2022–23

Premier Division

 Brackla
 Broadlands
 Brynna
 Caerau
 Caerau All Whites
 Carn Rovers
 FC Maesteg
 Llangynwyd Rangers
 Llanharry
 Sarn

Division One

 Bettws reserves
 Brackla reserves
 Bridgend Tref
 Broadlands reserves
 Bryncae
 Cefn Cribwr reserves
 Llangeinor reserves
 Maesteg Park reserves
 Pencoed Athletic reserves
 Pen-y-Bont third team
 Penyfai
 Tondu Robins

Division Two

 Bridgend Tref reserves
 Brynna reserves
 Caerau All Whites reserves
 Carn Rovers reserves
 Cefn Cribwr third team
 FC Maesteg reserves
 Llangeinor third team
 Llangynwyd Rangers reserves
 Llanharan
 Llynfi United
 Welfare Park

Promotion and relegation
Promotion from the Premier Division is possible to the South Wales Alliance League, with the champion of the league playing the other tier 7 champions from the South Wales regional leagues via play-off games to determine promotion.

Champions (Premier Division)
Information on all winners between 1980–81 and 2015–16 sourced from the league's website.

 1948–49: – Pencoed Athletic
 1980–81: – Tondu Robins
 1981–82: – Llanharan
 1982–83: – Tondu Robins
 1983–84: – Cefn Cribwr
 1984–85: – Maesteg Rangers
 1985–86: – Bettws
 1986–87: – Cefn Cribwr
 1987–88: – Cefn Cribwr
 1988–89: – Maesteg Rangers
 1989–90: – Llangynwd Rangers
 1990–91: – Bettws
 1991–92: – Maesteg Rangers
 1992–93: – Llanharry
 1993–94: – Coytrahen
 1994–95: – Caerau All Whites
 1995–96: – Caerau All Whites
 1996–97: – Bettws
 1997–98: – Brynna
 1998–99: – Pant yr Awel
 1999–2000: – Pant yr Awel
 2000–01: – Bettws
 2001–02: – Tondu Robbins
 2002–03: – Caerau All Whites
 2003–04: – Llangynwyd Rangers
 2004–05: – St Athans
 2005–06: – Brynna 
 2006–07: – Gilfach Goch 'A'
 2007–08: – G.W.R.
 2008–09: – Llanharan
 2009–10: – Caerau BC
 2010–11: – Brackla 
 2011–12: – Broadlands
 2012–13: – Brackla
 2013–14: – Cefn Cribwr
 2014–15: – Brackla
 2015–16: – Llanharry
 2016–17: – Llanharry 
 2017–18: – Llangeinor 
 2018–19: – Maesteg Park 
 2019–20: – Bettws
 2020–21: – League cancelled due to Coronavirus pandemic 
 2021–22: – Brackla

References

External links
 Bridgend & District League
 Bridgend & District League Twitter

8